Glyphipterix argyrosema is a species of sedge moths in the genus Glyphipterix. It is found in eastern Australia, including Tasmania.

References

External links
 Apistomorpha at Zipcodezoo.com
 Apistomorpha at Global Species

Moths described in 1880
Glyphipterigidae
Moths of Australia